The 2017 Hamburg knife attack was a stabbing incident that occurred on 28 July 2017 in Hamburg, Germany.

Attack 
At 3pm on 28 July 2017, Ahmad Alhaw, a Palestinian failed asylum seeker, went to an Edeka supermarket in Fuhlsbüttler Strasse in the Barmbek area of Hamburg. He took a 20 cm-long kitchen knife from the supermarket shelf and used it to attack several people, killing a 50-year-old German man. Deutsche Welle reported 6 injured in addition to the killing. According to eyewitnesses the man shouted "Allahu Akbar" during the attack. Prosecutors said that he had hoped to die as a martyr.

Suspect 
Der Spiegel reported the suspect, who was arrested at the scene, as a refugee named Ahmad A., who allegedly had contacts with the Salafist sect, as well as having psychological and drug problems. He is a 26-year-old Palestinian born in the United Arab Emirates who arrived in Germany in 2015. Hamburg's Interior Minister Andy Grote stated that the suspect "was known as an Islamist but not a jihadist".

Citing security sources, Berlin newspaper Der Tagesspiegel reported that the perpetrator was a failed asylum seeker who was known to German police; he had been added to the list of 800 suspected Islamists in Hamburg prior to the attack. The news agency DPA reported that security authorities were investigating evidence the man had Salafist ties.   He was awaiting deportation, but had not been deported because he did not have "identification and travel documents". While German prosecutors claim that the attacker had a "radical Islamist" motive, investigators have not found any links to jihadist groups. Alhaw also had watched ISIS propaganda videos online which radicalized him over a period of time.

References 

2010s in Hamburg
2017 in Germany
2017 murders in Germany
Islamic terrorism in Germany
Islamic terrorist incidents in 2017
July 2017 crimes in Europe
July 2017 events in Germany
Marketplace attacks
Mass stabbings in Germany
2017 knife attack
Stabbing attacks in 2017
Terrorist incidents in Germany in 2017
Terrorist incidents involving knife attacks